Last Man Standing is the first single from War of Angels, the second album by Pop Evil.  The song was heavily used by NASCAR, being part of the NASCAR Sprint Cup Series promotions.  The song was also featured on ESPN, utilized by the National Hockey League and played during the 2011 Super Bowl.

Premise 
Leigh Kakaty, lead vocalist for Pop Evil states that the song was penned in the midst of a difficult time with the former record company for the band, when the ensemble didn't know their future path.  Kakaty stated that the song is directed towards those who have been pinned to the ground and are still determined to succeed.  Indicating that staying ahead is becoming more and more difficult, the band made the statement "WE ARE HERE AND AREN'T GOING AWAY!"

Chart performance

References

Pop Evil songs
2010 singles
Song recordings produced by Johnny K
2010 songs
MNRK Music Group singles